Thomas Richard King (born April 4, 1969) is an American former professional basketball player who was selected by the Seattle SuperSonics in the first round (14th pick overall) of the 1991 NBA draft out of the University of Nebraska. Born in Lincoln and raised in Omaha, King was a high school standout in Nebraska. A 7'2", 260-lb. center, King played four seasons with the Sonics, appearing in a total of 72 games and averaging 1.9 ppg. King's professional career was cut short by injuries, undergoing 6 surgeries over his 7 years in the NBA.

After his playing career ended, King continued to reside in Seattle, working in real estate. He now works for Amazon as Director of Business Development for their Amazon Alexa division. He has expressed interest in becoming a minority owner in the Seattle NBA team if one returns to the city.

Career statistics

NBA

Source

Regular season

|-
| align="left" | 
| align="left" | Seattle
| 40 || 2 || 5.3 || .380 || .000 || .756 || 1.2 || .3 || .1 || .1 || 2.2
|-
| align="left" | 
| align="left" | Seattle
| 3 || 0 || 4.0 || .400 || – || 1.000 || 1.7 || .3 || .0 || .0 || 2.0
|-
| align="left" | 
| align="left" | Seattle
| 27 || 0 || 2.9 || .441 || .000 || .500 || .7 || .3 || .0 || .1 || 1.5
|-
| align="left" | 
| align="left" | Seattle
| 2 || 0 || 3.0 || .000 || – || .000 || .0 || .0 || .0 || .0 || .0
|-
| align="left" | Career
| align="left" |
| 72 || 2 || 4.3 || .393 || .000 || .662 || 1.0 || .3 || .1 || .1 || 1.9

References

External links
Basketball-Reference.com: Rich King

1969 births
Living people
American men's basketball players
Basketball players from Nebraska
Centers (basketball)
Nebraska Cornhuskers men's basketball players
Seattle SuperSonics draft picks
Seattle SuperSonics players
Sioux Falls Skyforce (CBA) players
Sportspeople from Lincoln, Nebraska
Sportspeople from Omaha, Nebraska